Scientific research in Sri Lanka is carried out by several research institutions, however, historically Sri Lanka has been behind regional peers in research funding. Sri Lanka was ranked 95th in the Global Innovation Index in 2021

Funding
The apex body in Sri Lanka for government research funding is the National Research Council of Sri Lanka. The Accelerating Higher Education Expansion and Development (AHEAD) a joint program between the Sri Lankan government and the World Bank provides research grants to Sri Lankan higher education institutes.

Institutions 
 Arthur C. Clarke Institute for Modern Technologies is a major research institution and the national focal point for space technology applications in Sri Lanka.

 Gem and Jewelry Research and Training Institute(GJRTI)
 Rice Research and Development Institute - Department of Agriculture
 Medical Research Institute of Sri Lanka
 Institute for Research & Development
 National Aquatic Resources Research and Development Agency
 Lanka Education and Research Network
 Tea Research Institute of Sri Lanka
 Rubber Research Institute of Sri Lanka
 Coconut Research Institute - Sri Lanka
Center for Defence Research and Development
 Kobbekaduwa Agrarian Research and Training Institute
 Ministry of Science Technology and Research
 Central Bank of Sri Lanka - Research Studies
 Sugarcane Research Institute - Sri Lanka
 Center for Women's Research (CENWOR)
 Veterinary Research Institute
 Institute of Policy Studies of Sri Lanka (IPS)
 Institute of Fundamental Studies
 Sri Lanka Institute of Nanotechnology
Sri Lanka Institute of Biotechnology
 Institute of Applied Statistics, Sri Lanka
 IHP - Institute for Health Policy Homepage
 Ministry of Science Technology and Research
 Sri Lanka Council for Agricultural Research Policy (SLCARP)
 Bandaranaike Memorial Ayurvedic Research Institute
 Clothing Industry Training Institute (CITI) and Textile Training Services Center (TTSC)
 Natural Resources Management Center (NRMC)
 Center for Telecommunication Research (CTR)
 National Engineering Research and Development Center (NERD)

Research universities 
University of Colombo (Western Province)
Sri Palee Campus
Institute of Indigenous Medicine
University of Colombo School of Computing 
University of Peradeniya (Central Province)
University of Sri Jayewardenepura (Western Province)
University of Kelaniya (Western Province)
Gampaha Wickramarachchi Ayurveda Institute
University of Moratuwa (Western Province)
University of Jaffna (Northern Province)
Ramanathan Academy of Fine Arts - Maruthanarmadam
Siddha Medicine Unit - Kaithady
Kilinochchi Campus
University of Ruhuna (Southern Province)
University of Vavuniya
 Open University of Sri Lanka
Eastern University, Sri Lanka (Eastern Province)
Trincomalee Campus
Swami Vipulananda Institute of Aesthetic Studies (Eastern Province)
South Eastern University of Sri Lanka, Oluvil (Eastern Province)
Rajarata University (North Central Province)
Sabaragamuwa University of Sri Lanka (Sabaragamuwa Province)
Wayamba University of Sri Lanka, Kuliyapitiya and Makandura (North Western Province)
Uva Wellassa University (Uva Province)
University of the Visual & Performing Arts (Western Province)
Sri Lanka Technological Campus (Western Province)
Sri Lanka Institute of Information Technology (Western Province)

See also

References 

 
Science and technology in Sri Lanka